is a railway station on the Iwate Ginga Railway Line in the town of Ichinohe, Iwate Prefecture, Japan, operated by the third-sector railway operator Iwate Ginga Railway Company.

Lines
Ichinohe Station is served by the Iwate Ginga Railway Line, and is located 64.5 kilometers from the starting point of the line at Morioka Station and 599.8 kilometers from Tokyo Station.

Station layout
Ichinohe Station has a single island platform connected to the station building by an underground passage. The station is staffed.

Platforms

Adjacent stations

Route bus 

JR Bus Tohoku
For Ninohe Station
For Kuzumaki via Kozuya
Nanbu Bus
Iwate-Kenhoku Bus

History
The station was absorbed into the JR East network upon the privatization of Japanese National Railways (JNR) on 1 April 1987, and was transferred to the Iwate Ginga Railway on 1 September 2002.

Passenger statistics
In fiscal 2015, the station was used by an average of 587 passengers daily.

Surrounding area
Ichinohe Town Hall
Ichinohe Post Office

See also
 List of Railway Stations in Japan

References

External links

  

Railway stations in Iwate Prefecture
Iwate Galaxy Railway Line
Railway stations in Japan opened in 1893
Ichinohe, Iwate